Little Walden is a small settlement in the Uttlesford district, in the English county of Essex.

The church, St.John's
 is a "remnant of Victorian concern for the spiritual welfare of the very poor labourers who lived here then".
The Crown Inn public house is situated on a bend in the B1052 road which runs through the village.

History
In Little Walden parish are the remains of a banked enclosure which may date from the Iron Age.

A World War II airfield to the north, RAF Little Walden, closed in 1958.

Transport
A bus service between Linton and Saffron Walden calls at Little Walden (Tuesdays only).

The nearest railway station is Great Chesterford.

References

External links 

Villages in Essex
Uttlesford